Massawepie  may refer to:
Massawepie Lake, a lake in Piercefield, New York, U.S.
Massawepie Mire, the largest bog in New York State
Massawepie, New York, a place in New York, U.S.
Massawepie Scout Camp, a Boy Scout reservation, on Massawepie Lake, New York, U.S.